Mark Capelin (born 2 July 1978) is an Australian former professional rugby league footballer who played for the Cronulla Sharks in the NRL.

Capelin, a local junior out of De La Salle, came through the ranks at the Sharks from the Under 19s.

A forward, he made two first-grade appearances in the 2001 NRL season. His debut came in round 9 against the Newcastle Knights, which he started as the Sharks' hooker. His only other first grade appearance came the following round when he featured off the bench against the New Zealand Warriors. He was released by the Sharks at the end of the 2001 season and never played first grade rugby league again

Since retirement, he became the owner of Tribe Social Fitness in Taren Point.

References

External links
Mark Capelin at Rugby League project

1978 births
Living people
Australian rugby league players
Cronulla-Sutherland Sharks players
Rugby league hookers